Fuchsia is a plant species in the genus Fuchsia.

Fuchsia may also refer to:

Science and technology
 Fuchsia (color), a reddish-purple color
 Fuchsia (operating system), an operating system by Google

Organisms
 Brazilian fuchsia, Justicia floribunda
 California fuchsia, Epilobium canum (formerly Zauschneria californica)
 Cape fuchsia, plant species in the genus Phygelius
 Fuchsia bush, plants species in the genus Eremophila
 Fuchsia (moth), a concealer moth genus of subfamily Amphisbatinae

Arts and entertainment
 Fuchsia Groan, a fictional character in the Gormenghast novels by Mervyn Peake
 Fuchsia (band), a 1970s musical group
 Fuchsia (film), a 2009 Philippine film
 Fuchsia, one of The Devil Girls, characters in the Sinfest comic strip
 Fuchsia City, a settlement in the Kanto region of the Pokémon universe

Other uses
 Fuchsia (clothing) a former fashion company
 USS Fuchsia (1863), a ship of the Union Navy in the American Civil War